Marie-Josée Lord (born 1970) is a Haiti-born Canadian soprano. Lord was adopted from Haiti at the age of six and grew up in Lévis. She made her professional debut as Liù in Turandot in 2003 at the Opéra de Québec. She was particularly noted for her Suor Angelica in 2006. Her debut album of arias was released in 2011, becoming one of the Canadian label Atma's best-selling recordings.

Discography
 Marie-Josée Lord: Opera Arias. Orchestre Métropolitain, conductor Giuseppe Pietraroia. ATMA Classique, 2010
 Yo soy Maria. Simon Leclerc. ATMA Classique, 2012
 Amazing Grace. Ensemble Vocal Épiphanie, Jean-Willy Kunz (organ), Antoine Bareil (violin). ATMA Classique, 2014
 Femme - Verdi, Puccini, Massenet. Orchestre symphonique de Laval, conductor Alain Trudel. ATMA Classique, 2018

References

External links
 
 Former official website

Living people
Haitian emigrants to Canada
Canadian operatic sopranos
Canadian adoptees
People from Lévis, Quebec
Haitian Quebecers
1970 births
21st-century Canadian women opera singers